Boussu is a municipality of Wallonia located in the province of Hainaut, Belgium. 

As of January 1, 2006, Boussu had a population of 20,058. The total area is 20.01 km², which gives a population density of 1,002 inhabitants per km².

The municipality consists of the following districts: Boussu and Hornu.

History 

During the late Middle Ages the town gave his name to an important branch of the House of Hénin. The castle of Boussu was constructed in this period, and important members of this family are buried inside the church. Most famous is the Mausoleum of Maximilien II de Hénin, 5th Count of Bossu.

In the 19th century local industry expanded. A planned industrial city, called le Grand Hornu, was constructed.
Located in Hornu, the buildings are now a museum.

Etymology 
As its neighbouring municipality, Hornu, Boussu's town is very old and the history of Saint Waudru mentions the existence of a church in the 13th century. In the acts of the past, Boussu conquered very diverse titles: Buxutum, Bussuth, Bussut, Bossut, Boussut. However, the etymology is very simple. This means "the place abundant in boxwood" (in Latin buxus: meaning boxwood or buxutum meaning boxwood coppice).

Famous inhabitants
Marcel Moreau, writer
Massimo Bruno, Footballer and Belgian youth international

References

External links
 

Municipalities of Hainaut (province)